Penthosia is a genus of flies in the family Tachinidae.

Species
P. satanica (Bigot, 1889)

References

Phasiinae
Diptera of North America
Tachinidae genera
Taxa named by Frederik Maurits van der Wulp